Alcina Dimitrescu (Oruchīna Dimitoresuku), better known as Lady Dimitrescu, is a character in the 2021 survival horror game Resident Evil Village, developed and published by Capcom. One of the major antagonistic figures of Village, she is presented as a gigantic noblewoman with vampire-like traits who resides with her three daughters in Castle Dimitrescu, her stronghold within the vicinity of the titular Eastern European village encountered by protagonist Ethan Winters. Dimitrescu governs the village alongside three mutant lords under the oversight of a supreme leader known as Mother Miranda. Lady Dimitrescu's physical design was modeled off Polish model Helena Mankowska, while her voice acting and motion capture were performed by American theatre actress Maggie Robertson.

Following initial previews of Village, Lady Dimitrescu unexpectedly rose in popularity and has become subject to a significant amount of fan-driven labor, including fan art, cosplay, memes, and erotica. Journalists and commentators took note of the trend, which began before the release of Village in May 2021, attributing the rapid surge of fan interest in the character to various aspects of her appearance and sex appeal. Robertson's performance as Lady Dimitrescu was positively-received, and won her several awards.

Concept and creation
Created by Capcom for the 2021 video game Resident Evil Village, Lady Dimitrescu was born from the desire to create a charismatic femme fatale character. She was designed as a "bewitching vampire" antagonist as part of the developer's efforts to revisit the Resident Evil franchise's survival horror roots. Her character design was inspired by the 16th century Hungarian noblewoman Elizabeth Báthory, the Japanese urban legend and internet ghost story of Hasshaku-sama (or Hachishaku-sama), and Anjelica Huston's portrayal of the character Morticia Addams from The Addams Family. Aspects of Dimitrescu's characterization also references Ramon Salazar from Resident Evil 4, a diminutive villain said to have resonated with many players as a memorable antagonist. Dimitrescu has been falsely pronounced as Dimitreesk in English, with the final "u" letter being silent. This approach has been criticized by Romanian speakers who have said that the correct pronunciation is "dimi-tres-ku", for her name is Romanian.

According to Tomonori Takano, the art director for Resident Evil Village, the developmental team intended to move away from using simplistic elements like zombies to scare players and instead focused on creating unique situations and memorable characters that would create fear in new ways, continuing a trend which began in Resident Evil 7: Biohazard, the predecessor to Village. The boss character of the Castle Dimitrescu area, Lady Dimitrescu is presented as a nigh invulnerable enemy with long retractable sharp claws that extend from her finger tips. Dimitrescu is programmed to stalk the player-controlled Ethan Winters throughout her castle; she is meant to be constantly evaded by the player, much like Mr. X from the  2019 remake of Resident Evil 2 or members of the Baker family from Resident Evil 7.

Dimitrescu commands her "daughters" Bela, Cassandra, and Daniela as her subordinates, products of her experiments with the Cadou parasite whose bodies are composed of imitation flies that aggregate into the forms of the corpses they devoured and can only thrive within the castle walls. Castle Dimitrescu, inspired by Peleș Castle in Romania, was originally conceived as being inhabited by "dozens upon dozens" of Dimitrescu's daughters, but the family was ultimately shortlisted to Alcina Dimitrescu and her three daughters following trial and error and testing of the game's pacing. Dimitrescu and her daughters, who compete with each other for their mother's attention and approval, feed off human blood to sustain themselves, with the remains of their male victims discarded and left in a crucified state outside of Castle Dimitrescu. Dimitrescu is said to be highly protective of her daughters in a maternal fashion, which the developers approached by presenting her story as paralleling that of Ethan's own family whom he is also trying to protect.

As Takano wanted to avoid typical gothic imagery associated with past Resident Evil games as well as the horror genre as a whole, the Dimitrescu women's visual design reference fashion trends from the 1930s era instead, while the sisters' clothing are finely embroidered with floral patterns of the Dimitrescu family crest. Her appearance first came about in an early prototype that used the model of Ethan's wife Mia Winters from Resident Evil 7 but with a hat and a dress, which gave her a ghost-like appearance, but not one that comes across as overly scary. The team scaled-up the model in game and discovered that the additional accessories provided that necessary element. Based on this prototype, one of the first pieces of concept art Takano drew of Lady Dimitrescu involved her imposing visage leaning down to step through a doorway and demonstrating her over nine-foot height, which he recognized needed to be a scene in the final game, as well as being present in the game's first trailer.

Theatrical actress Maggie Robertson provided both voice acting and motion capture for Dimitrescu. She had auditioned for the role on a whim having recently moved from eastern United States to Los Angeles, and was surprised by the role, her first in video games. She considered adopting animal techniques while preparing for the part and considered the character to be "catlike," thus she used feline movement as the inspiration for her own motions.

In the DLC expansion "The Mercenaries: Additional Orders" for Resident Evil Village released in October 2022, Lady Dimitrescu is one of the playable characters. To give players smoother gameplay, Director Kento Kinoshita decided to lower her height.

Appearances
Alcina was born into the noble Dimitrescu family sometime before World War I. Although her family traced their origins to Cesare, one of the four founders of an isolated mountain village in Europe, Alcina lived elsewhere, perhaps through a cadet branch. In the aftermath of World War II and the abolition of the nobility, Dimitrescu returned to her family's former lands, which had fallen under the control of a neopagan cult worshipping the Black God. Dimitrescu suffered a hereditary blood disease prior to meeting Miranda who infected her with the Cadou parasite to see if she was compatible for her plans to revive her daughter. Although bestowed with profound regenerative capabilities and eternal life, Alcina's preexisting blood disease required her to ingest large quantities of human blood and flesh on a regular basis to maintain her condition, increasing her size while siring her "daughters" Daniela, Bela and Cassandra. Upon inhabiting the estate, she took over her family's vineyard and wine-distribution business as a means of supporting herself. The Dimitrescu family was closely associated with the noble Beneviento, Moreau, and Heisenberg families, and maintained an alliance with them in controlling the region. This control allowed Dimitrescu's family to rule her castle with barbarous cruelty, regularly taking in new staff to replace those who were taken to the dungeon to be killed with their blood used to create an enriched red wine. The umbrella shaped symbol that represents Dimitrescu, Heisenberg, Moreau, and Beneviento was borrowed by Oswell E. Spencer as the logo of the Umbrella Corporation.

Ethan Winters was captured by Dimitrescu's daughters and strung up on a wall to be drained of blood, but manages to free himself and kill the daughters one at a time. This infuriates her as she ignores Miranda's orders to personally kill Ethan, forced into mutating into her true dragon-like form while confronting Ethan within her estate's family crypt and ultimately dies at his hand.

Promotion and merchandise
To promote Resident Evil Village, Capcom distributed life-size standees of Lady Dimitrescu in video game stores. In Hong Kong, promotional material featuring the character was displayed on public transportation in early 2021. Notable merchandise which feature the character include life-sized towels which were offered as prizes for Japanese participants in a competition held on Twitter. Professional cosplayer Yaya Han uploaded a video sponsored by Capcom on her YouTube channel, which documents the process behind her cosplay activities as the character in April 2021. On April 30, 2021, a puppet show miniseries featuring Dimitrescu alongside her peers was released on the official biohazard YouTube channel. Her likeness has been co-opted by third party brands such as Domino's Pizza Malaysia to promote their products. A three foot tall statue of Lady Dimitrescu made by PureArts in collaboration with Capcom is scheduled to be released in second quarter 2023.

Reception
Lady Dimitrescu received a very positive reception from critics and players following her initial reveal in a promotional trailer for Resident Evil Village which debuted in 2020, and for her appearance in the PlayStation 5-exclusive demo Maiden released on January 21, 2021. By February 2021, Takano publicly acknowledged what he later described as an unexpectedly enthusiastic response to the character. Even though Village was scheduled for launch on May 7, 2021, Dimitrescu's surge in popularity in early 2021 led to a significant proliferation of fan exploration of the character's concepts through fan art; received a fan-made action-figure commercial, cosplay activities by notable individuals such as Han or Olympic bronze medalist Yekaterina Lisina; and internet memes, which sometimes involved participation by other video game developers on social media. Dimitrescu has been the subject of fan mods for video games; examples include a mod for Fallout 4 which recreates her long-sleeved ivory gown to be worn by the player character, or a mod for Village which replaces Dimitrescu's face with that of Thomas the Tank Engine, with Eurogamer describing it as the "headline act" of the game's "burgeoning mod scene". In March 2021, Epic Games included Lady Dimitrescu along with series protagonists Jill Valentine and Ethan Winters in a list of characters and brands as part of a 2021 survey it distributed to Fortnite players in order to gauge interest in future crossover promotions. She was also included in Teppen expansion. In December 2021, Ed Nightingale of Eurogamer described her as the "Icon of the year".

Several commentators discussed at length about the phenomenon behind the character's popularity, with many identifying her unusually tall height as a key element which drew fan interest. Leon Hurley from GamesRadar observed that Dimitrescu is not the main villain of Village or its most important character, but nevertheless has become more prominent, popular, discussed, and imitated than was originally intended or expected. In light of the character's positive reception, Jess Kinghorn also from GamesRadar suggested that the video game industry should be less fixated with youthfulness by featuring more older female characters who are nuanced in characterization.

Certain commentators have suggested that some of the fan interest in the character is erotic or sexual in nature, specifically feminine dominance. Dimistrescu's popularity has indeed inspired a substantial amount of fan-made pornography or expressions of desire to participate in sexual or erotic fetishism. The character is said to have generated some interest in trampling, the act of being stepped on by a partner playing a sexually dominant role, in particular. Professional erotica writer Gemma Glitter attributed interest in the character by some corners to macrophilia, in this case a fascination of giant-sized women. Steven T. Wright from Input Mag reported that Lady Dimitrescu's sex appeal represents the fetishization of their body height for several real-life tall women, as she is considered to be "simultaneously a beacon of their own power and allure, and a painful reminder of the complex social stigmas society attaches to femme body shape".<ref name=Input>{{cite web|url=https://www.inputmag.com/gaming/what-real-life-tall-women-really-think-about-resident-evil-villages-tall-vampire-lady-dimitrescu|title=What real-life tall women really think about 'Resident Evil Villages tall vampire lady|last=Wright|first=Steven|date=May 7, 2021|work=Input Mag|access-date=May 6, 2021|archive-date=May 7, 2021|archive-url=https://web.archive.org/web/20210507044543/https://www.inputmag.com/gaming/what-real-life-tall-women-really-think-about-resident-evil-villages-tall-vampire-lady-dimitrescu|url-status=live}}</ref> 

Maggie Robertson has earned multiple awards for her performance as Lady Dimitrescu. She won Best Performer at the 2021 Golden Joystick Awards, Best Performance at The Game Awards 2021, the Great White Way Award for Best Acting in a Game at the 11th Annual New York Game Awards, and the Outstanding Performance in a Drama, Supporting award at the 21st annual NAVGTR Awards. At the 25th Annual D.I.C.E. Awards, Robertson accepted the award for Outstanding Achievement in Character on behalf of the Village'' development team in recognition for their collective work with Lady Dimitrescu.

Notes

References

Further reading

Capcom antagonists
Female characters in video games
Female video game villains
Fictional monsters
Fictional serial killers
Fictional cannibals
Fictional cult leaders
Fictional characters with gigantism
Fictional lords and ladies
Fictional Eastern European people
Fictional Romanian people
Internet memes introduced in 2021
Mutant characters in video games
Resident Evil characters
Vampire characters in video games
Video game bosses
Video game characters based on real people
Video game characters introduced in 2021
Video game memes
Nobility characters in video games
Interactive Achievement Award winners